The IMOCA 60 Class yacht No Way Back, NED 160 was designed by VPLP design and Guillaume Verdier and launched in the 18 August 2015 after being built Persico in Italy.
The boat had structural issues during the 2022 Route de Rhum when the ballast tanks demounted themselves. This while retiring from the race the previous day and heading back towards Portugal led to an onboard fire and the boat was lost,

Racing results

Timeline

Vento di Sardegna (2015)
The boat was originally commissioned by Italian skipper Andrea Mura however he lost his sponsor and had to sell the boat before it was completed.

No Way Back (2016-2017)
On the 3rd February 2016 it was announced Pieter Heerema has brought the boat to compete in the 2016-2017 Vendee Globe un the name No Way Back, NED 160

Newrest-Art & Fenêtres (2017-2021)

Nexans-Art & Fenêtres (2021-2022)

References 

Individual sailing yachts
2010s sailing yachts
Sailboat type designs by Guillaume Verdier
Sailing yachts designed by VPLP
Sailboat types built in Italy
Vendée Globe boats
IMOCA 60